Interstate 375 may refer to:
Interstate 375 (Florida), a spur in St. Petersburg, Florida
Interstate 375 (Michigan), a spur in Detroit, Michigan

75-3
3